Fur Traders Descending the Missouri is an 1845 painting by George Caleb Bingham. One of Bingham's most famous paintings, this work is owned by the Metropolitan Museum of Art in New York. Bingham brought the painting to St. Louis, Missouri on June 4, 1845, along with several other pieces of artwork. 

Painted around 1845 in the style called luminism by some historians of American art, it was originally entitled, French-Trader, Half-breed Son. The American Art Union thought the title potentially controversial and renamed it when it was first exhibited. It reflected the reality of fur traders' common marriages with Native American women; in Canada the Métis ethnic group formed as a result. The toque cap that the father is wearing suggests that he is a voyageur of French descent.  A close examination of the animal in the front of the canoe, and in particular its pointed ears, long, sharp snout, and visible tongue, shows that this is a black fox.  Black fox pelts were the most expensive, and therefore most desirable, furs of the time, but in addition black foxes were regarded as spiritually symbolic creatures by many Native American tribes.

References

1845 paintings
Paintings by George Caleb Bingham
Paintings in the collection of the Metropolitan Museum of Art
Bears in art